is a Japanese former volleyball player who competed in the 1968 Summer Olympics.

In 1968 he was part of the Japanese team which won the silver medal in the Olympic tournament. He played all nine matches.

External links
 profile

1945 births
Living people
Japanese men's volleyball players
Olympic volleyball players of Japan
Volleyball players at the 1968 Summer Olympics
Olympic silver medalists for Japan
Olympic medalists in volleyball
Asian Games medalists in volleyball
Volleyball players at the 1966 Asian Games
Volleyball players at the 1970 Asian Games
Medalists at the 1968 Summer Olympics
Medalists at the 1966 Asian Games
Medalists at the 1970 Asian Games
Asian Games gold medalists for Japan